Coenophila is a genus of moths of the family Noctuidae.

Species
 Coenophila opacifrons Grote, 1878
 Coenophila subrosea – rosy marsh moth (Stephens, 1829)

References
 Coenophila at Markku Savela's Lepidoptera and Some Other Life Forms
 Natural History Museum Lepidoptera genus database

Noctuinae